Community is an American sitcom which premiered on September 17, 2009, on NBC. The series follows a group of students at a community college in the fictional locale of Greendale, Colorado. The series heavily uses meta-humor and pop culture references, often parodying film and television clichés and tropes. The series was canceled by NBC in May 2014. However, Yahoo! Screen picked it up for a sixth and final season.

Series overview

Episodes

Season 1 (2009–10)

Season 2 (2010–11)

Season 3 (2011–12)

Season 4 (2013)

Season 5 (2014)

Season 6 (2015)

Community: The Movie 
On September 30, 2022, after long speculation, it was officially announced that a feature length film would be released by the streaming service Peacock. The film will see the return of original cast members Joel McHale, Alison Brie, Gillian Jacobs, Danny Pudi, Jim Rash and Ken Jeong. In November 2022, Dan Harmon stated that Donald Glover would also be reprising his role in the upcoming film.

Webisodes

The 5 As (2009)
The 5 As of Greendale is a webisode series that appeared before Communitys pilot was broadcast. The videos are set up as informational videos featuring dean of admissions Pat Isakson (Dan Harmon) welcoming potential students to Greendale Community College.

Six Candles
Abed's short film about his family life starring Jeff and Britta as his parents. This ties in to season 1, episode 3 ("Introduction to Film").

The Community College Chronicles (2009)
The Community College Chronicles are two webisodes that act as Abed Nadir's student films. The webisodes parody events that happen on the main show Community. In the episode "Debate 109", the webisodes were seen by the characters making them believe Abed can see the future. The webisodes also appear on the Greendale Community College's website part of the A/V department's page.

Spanish Videos (2010)
Spanish Videos are two webisodes (plus a trailer) featuring Star-Burns (Dino Stamatopoulos), Abed (Danny Pudi), and Señor Chang (Ken Jeong). Chang assigns the class a video assignment and Abed and Star-Burns make a space epic.

Study Break (2010)
Study Break is a series of three mini-episodes of Community exclusive to Comcast's Xfinity TV and to the season one DVD of Community. The mini-episodes focus on 90 second study breaks during a Spanish study session.

Road to the Emmys (2010)
Road to the Emmys are three webisodes about the study group on their way to an Emmy party.

Dean Pelton's Office Hours (2010)
Dean Pelton's Office Hours are three webisodes focusing on Dean Pelton (Jim Rash) solving student problems.

Save Greendale (2012)
They encourage people to come to Greendale.

Abed's Master Key (2012)
Abed's Master Key are three animated webisodes in which Abed becomes Dean Pelton's assistant and is given a master key to Greendale.

Others

Ratings

Notes

References

External links
 Community at NBC
 Community at Sony Pictures Television
 

Community